The 16th Syracuse Grand Prix was a motor race, run to Formula One rules, held on 21 May 1967 at Syracuse Circuit, Sicily. The race was run over 56 laps of the circuit, and finished in an extremely unusual dead heat between British driver Mike Parkes and his team-mate Ludovico Scarfiotti in their Ferrari 312s.

The event attracted a very small entry, and this was the last Syracuse Grand Prix to be held as a Formula One event.

Results

References
 "The Grand Prix Who's Who", Steve Small, 1995.
 Race results at www.silhouet.com 
 Race results at www.f1-images.de 

Syracuse Grand Prix
Syracuse Grand Prix
Syracuse Grand Prix
Syracuse Grand Prix